The Talking Cure and chimney sweeping were terms Bertha Pappenheim, known in case studies by the alias Anna O., used for the verbal therapy given to her by Josef Breuer. They were first published in Studies on Hysteria (1895).

As Ernest Jones put it, "On one occasion she related the details of the first appearance of a particular symptom and, to Breuer's great astonishment, this resulted in its complete disappearance," or in Lacan's words, "the more Anna provided signifiers, the more she chattered on, the better it went".

Development

Invention of the term
Breuer found that Pappenheim's symptoms—headaches, excitement, curious vision disturbances, partial paralyses, and loss of sensation, which had no organic origin and are now called somatoform disorders—improved once the subject expressed her repressed trauma and related emotions, a process later called catharsis. Peter Gay considered that, "Breuer rightly claimed a quarter of a century later that his treatment of Bertha Pappenheim contained 'the germ cell of the whole of psychoanalysis'."

Sigmund Freud later adopted the term talking cure to describe the fundamental work of psychoanalysis. He himself referenced Breuer and Anna O. in his Lectures on Psychoanalysis at Clark University, Worcester, MA, in September 1909: "The patient herself, who, strange to say, could at this time only speak and understand English, christened this novel kind of treatment the 'talking cure' or used to refer to it jokingly as 'chimney-sweeping'."

Locus classicus
There are currently three English translations of Studies on Hysteria, the first by A. A. Brill (1937), the second by James Strachey (1955), included in the Standard Edition, and the third by Nicola Luckhurst (2004). The following samples come from Breuer’s case study on “Anna O...” where the concept of talking cure appears for the first time and illustrate how the translations differ:

Current status

Mental health professionals now use the  term talking cure more widely to mean any of a variety of talking therapies. Some consider that after a century of employment the talking cure has finally led to the writing cure.

The Talking Cure: The science behind psychotherapy is also the name of a book published by Holt and authored by Susan C. Vaughan MD in 1997. It explores the way in which psychotherapy reshapes the  through incorporating neuroscience research with psychotherapy research and research on development.  It contains clinical vignettes of the "talking cure" in action from real psychotherapies.

Celebrity endorsement

The actress Diane Keaton attributes her recovery from bulimia to the talking cure: "All those disjointed words and half-sentences, all those complaining, awkward phrases...made the difference. It was the talking cure; the talking cure that gave me a way out of addiction; the damn talking cure."

See also
 Psychotherapy

References

Further reading
 Campbell, Terence W.: Beware the Talking Cure (1994).
 Gammell, Irene: Confessional Politics (1999).

External links
 Alain de Mijolla, "Cathartic Method"
 John Launer, "Anna O and the 'talking cure'"

Psychoanalytic theory